Grace and the Bigger Picture is the second album by British band Johnny Foreigner and was released on Best Before Records worldwide on 26 October 2009. The album was recorded at Futureshock Studios in Brooklyn and produced by Alex Newport (assisted by Chris Tabron and Brenden Beu) in early 2009.

Track listing

Personnel
 Alexei Berrow - guitars
 Kelly Southern - bass
 Junior Elvis Washington Laidley  - drums

References

2009 albums
Johnny Foreigner albums
Albums produced by Alex Newport